The Zimbabwe national cricket team toured England in the 1985 season and played seven first-class matches, mostly against county teams. The Zimbabweans also played two one-day matches.

References

External links

1985 in cricket
1985 in English cricket
1985
International cricket competitions from 1980–81 to 1985